The siriometer is an obsolete astronomical unit of length, defined to be equal to one million astronomical units (au). The distance from Earth to the star Sirius is then approximately 0.54 siriometers.

The unit was proposed in 1911 by Carl V. L. Charlier who used the symbol 'sir.' Others have suggested denoting the unit with the symbol 'Sm'.

The siriometer never gained widespread usage. The first General Assembly of the International Astronomical Union in 1922 adopted the parsec as the standard unit of stellar distances, which simplified the definition of absolute magnitude. Professional astronomers use the parsec as their primary unit of distances larger than the Solar System.

Further reading

References

Units of length